The Grinning Man is a tragicomic musical based on Victor Hugo's 1869 novel The Man Who Laughs with a book by Carl Grose, music by Tim Phillips, Marc Teitler and lyrics by Carl Grose, Tom Morris, Tim Phillips and Marc Teitler.

Production history

Bristol (2016) 
The musical made its world premiere at the Bristol Old Vic, beginning previews from 13 October, with a press night on 20 October, for a limited run until 13 November 2016. The production was directed by Tom Morris, set designed by Jon Bausor, costume designed by Jean Chan, movement direction by Jane Gibson, lighting design by Richard Howell, sound design by Simon Baker, with puppetry direction and design by Gyre & Gimble (Finn Caldwell and Toby Olié).

London (2017-18) 
Following the success of the Bristol run, the musical transferred to the Trafalgar Studios (Studio 1) in London's West End beginning previews from 5 December, with a press night on 18 December 2017. The production ended its extended run on 5 May 2018.

During the COVID-19 pandemic, it was announced the Bristol Old Vic would stream an archive recording of the production (featuring the original Bristol cast) on YouTube from 26 June to 3 July 2020.

The playtext was published by Samuel French, Inc. on 5 May 2021.

Cast and characters

Summary

Act I 
The show opens on Barkilphedro who introduces the audience to the story ("Laughter Is The Best Medicine"). We are introduced to the Royal Family. Lord David is at the puppet show and watches as Ursus introduces Grinpayne at the local freak-show, who proceeds to tell his story. Young Grinpayne (Puppeteered by the actor of Grinpayne) is rushed to catch a boat by his Mother, but upon seeing his face he's refused admission by the boat's sailors, who force his mother away from him ("Show us your face"/"Give me back my Mother"); and the boat sails into a storm, leaving Grinpayne alone with memories of his (hanged) Father ("Hymn of the Hanged"). Young Grinpayne walks and discovers a child, whom he takes from her dead mother - a young Dea. The two encounter a wolf, who leads them to his master, Ursus. Although shocked by Grinpayne's face, Ursus agrees to allow them to stay ("Stars in the Sky"). A few years later, Young Dea is blind; but has formed a strong connection with Grinpayne ("Blind to Nothing"). She begs her Father (The role Ursus has taken in both children's lives) to tell the story of beauty and the beast, but ultimately her and Grinpayne end up acting it out with their puppets; and the two grow up, with the puppeteers taking the place of the puppet counterparts ("Beauty and the Beast"). Meanwhile, the King dies, and the coronation proceeds to his Daughter, Angelica, but is skipped by her lazy sister, Josiana, and her lover and brother, David ("Weep Oh Weep"). Barkilphedro, in partial madness, sees the King come back to life and expresses a desire to be made into a Lord. Angelica sets about creating a tyrannical rule. Grinpayne expresses confusion as to why Dea loves him and believes she would not if she could see him ("Something's going to Change"). Josiana rings for Barkilphedro to come to her chambers, where she is angry her Brother has chosen the fair over her. Angelica arrives and tells her to warn their brother that if he returns to the fair he will be exiled, and tells Josiana she must marry, to Josiana's horror. David returns and begins rambling about a new exhibit of "The Grinning Man" at the fair who has revolutionised his life - in curiosity, Josiana agrees to come, bringing Barkilphedro with them ("Never Seen a Face Like This"). Grinpayne and Dea reveal feelings for one another ("Born Broken"). Grinpayne goes onstage for his act, in front of Josiana, David and Barkilphedro, where he reveals his face for the first time ("I am the Freak Show"). Barkilphedro recognises Grinpayne. The show ends and Ursus is enamoured with Grinpayne's performance ("Roll Up"). The two argue, however, as Ursus denies any knowledge to who Grinpayne is. It is revealed that to reduce his pain, Grinpayne has been taking a potion, crafted by Ursus. Grinpayne receives a letter from Josiana who is enamoured with him and his performance, and gives the impression she knows him ("Josiana's Letter"). Grinpayne is excited by this prospect of finally discovering who he is and decides to meet her ("A Scar is Born")

Act II 
Grinpayne expresses a wish to know who he is, believing Dea would not love him if she could see him ("Labyrinth"). Ursus has been captured by Barkilphedro. Ursus reveals Grinpayne's potion is also a forgetting potion so he will not remember Barkilphedro. Dea arrives, demanding Ursus be let go. Barkilphedro reveals he was the one who hung Grinpayne's Father (who is revealed to be a traitor to the King), but a moment of pity allowed him to let Grinpayne and his mother go - mutilating Grinpayne's face so he would not be recognised ("Only a Clown"/"Give me Back My Mother (Reprise)"). Josiana meets with Grinpayne, and the two begin getting intimate ("Brand New World of Feeling") when Grinpayne is summoned to the palace and captured. Whilst there, Angelica strips David of his Lord status and kicks him out to the street; but when convinced to look at Grinpayne's exposed face, she is so moved she gives him the status of Lord, and makes Barkilphedro his servant, infuriating him, before she issues a demand to him for whoever mutilated Grinpayne to be found and killed. She also demands the fair be destroyed. ("The Smiling Song"). Grinpayne awakens the next morning and Angelica requires him to marry, but Barkilphedro refuses to allow him to marry Dea - suggesting Josiana may be a better match - to which both Angelica and Josiana agree. Barkilphedro terrified Ursus and Dea may reveal his secret, convinces Grinpayne to allow him to go to see Grinpayne's family to ask for Dea's hand in Grinpayne's stead, with the ulterior motive of wanting to retrieve Grinpayne's medicine recipe so Grinpayne will never remember how he was the one who caused his mutilation. He takes one of Grinpayne's puppets. On the way, Barkilphedro runs into David on the streets and taunts him. Dea awakens with no memory, having been administered Grinpayne's memory-forgetting medicine. Barkilphedro tells the family Grinpayne wishes to distance himself from the family, due to becoming a lord, presenting the puppet as proof of his word. He receives the medicine recipe and leaves, saying it was nice to see them again. The word "again" triggers Dea's memory of the torture room. Ursus attempts and fails to once again administer the potion to Dea, and she realises the potion is what makes Grinpayne forget his past, and she insists on seeing Grinpayne, leaving Ursus ("A New Beginning"). The fair is burned down. Ursus only just managing to escape flees to the Docks ("Burn Down the Fair"). Grinpayne again asks Angelica permission to marry Dea, but Angelica tells him Dea died when the fair burned down. Devastated, Grinpayne agrees to marry Josiana. At the wedding, David interrupts, declaring he cannot allow Josiana to marry Grinpayne, challenging Grinpayne to a duel. Grinpayne collapses in pain, having not had his medicine, when Dea charges into the room and tells him how his potion takes his memory; and he smashes the bottle, finally remembering his past ("The Last Kiss"). He fights David and nearly kills him, to Josiana's horror. She realises he is the one she loves, and the duel ends. Grinpayne remembers how Barkilphedro is the one who cut him, but it is revealed Ursus allowed it to happen to receive safe passage on a ship with his Wife and Child. Grinpayne is about to kill Barkilphedro when his Mother appears to him and begs him not to, repeating the plea she gave Barkilphedro when he was to kill Young Grinpayne ("Give Me Back my Mother (Reprise)"). Grinpayne forgives Barkilphedro. Dea realises she is Ursus' daughter and is horrified to realise she is the reason Grinpayne was mutilated, but Grinpayne refuses to blame her declaring he loves her ("The Smile on your Face"). Grinpayne and Dea run to intercept Ursus before he leaves. Barkilphedro is condemned to retell the story over and over in a theatre. Ursus is thrilled to know Dea is his daughter, and Grinpayne forgives him. Ursus gives Dea and Grinpayne money to flee on a ship, and requests they leave him behind. The two leave together ("Stars in the Sky (Reprise)").

Song list

 Act I
"Grab It By The Horn (Pre Show)" - Hans And The Bleeding Cheeks, Company Musicians
"Laughter Is The Best Medicine" - Barkilphedro, King Clarence, Josiana, Dirry-Moir, Angelica, Company   
"Show Us Your Face" - Mother, Grinpayne, Company
"The Mothers Song" - Mother, Grinpayne
"Hymn Of The Hanged" - Trelaw, Grinpayne
"Cry Of Pain" - Grinpayne
"Stars In The Sky" - Ursus
"Blind To Nothing" - Dea, Ursus, Grinpayne
"Beauty And The Beast" - Grinpayne, Dea
"Weep Oh Weep" - Kupsak, Company
"Somethings Going To Change" - Queen Angelica, Kupsak, Company
"Never Seen A Face Like This" - Dirry-Moir, Josiana
"Born Broken" - Dea, Grinpayne, Ursus
"I Am The Freak Show" - Grinpayne
"Roll Up!" - Company
"Josiana's Letter" - Josiana, Grinpayne
"A Scar Is Born!" - Grinpayne, Company

 Act II
 "Labyrinth" - Grinpayne
"Only a Clown/Give Me Back My Mother (Reprise)" - Barkilphedro, Trelaw, King Clarence, Mother, Grinpayne, Ursus
"Brand New World Of Feeling" - Grinpayne, Josiana
"The Smiling Song" - Grinpayne, Company
"A New Beginning" - Grinpayne, Queen Angelica, Josiana, Dirry-Moir, Company
"Burn Down The Fair" - Barkilphedro, Quake, Company
Finale: "The Last Kiss" "Revenge And Mercy" "The Smile In Your Face" "Beauty And The Beast" "New Royal Motto" - Grinpayne, Dea, Josiana, Queen Angelica, Dirry-Moir, Barkilphedro, Mother, Trelaw, Company 
"Stars In The Sky (Reprise)" - Grinpayne, Dea, Ursus, Company

A cast recording was released on 13 July 2018, featuring the Original London Cast, which contained 19 songs from the show, including a bonus track 'Only a Clown', recorded by Julian Bleach.

Reception
The Grinning Man received mostly positive reviews, with The Guardian calling it "a fabulously theatrical conceit" and giving it four out of five stars, and The Stage calling it "unusual yet enticing". However, the Evening Standard gave it two out of five stars, citing the "dismayingly unclear" narrative and "largely unmemorable"  music and singing.

References

2016 musicals
Adaptations of works by Victor Hugo
Musicals based on novels
West End musicals
British musicals